The Federação Maranhense de Futebol (English: Football Association of Maranhão state) was founded on January 11, 1918, and it manages all the official football tournaments within the state of Maranhão, which are the Campeonato Maranhense, the Campeonato Maranhense lower levels and the Copa União do Maranhão, and represents the clubs at the Brazilian Football Confederation (CBF).

References

Maranhense
Football in Maranhão
Sports organizations established in 1918